The 2013 Furman Paladins team represented Furman University as a member of the Southern Conference (SoCon) during the 2013 NCAA Division I FCS football season. Led by third-year head coach Bruce Fowler, the Paladins compiled an overall record of 8–6 with a mark of 6–2 in conference play, sharing the SoCon with Chattanooga and Samford. Furman advanced to the NCAA Division I Football Championship playoffs, where they beat South Carolina State in the first round before falling the eventual national champion, North Dakota State, the second round. The team played home games at Paladin Stadium in Greenville, South Carolina.

Schedule

References

Furman
Furman Paladins football seasons
Southern Conference football champion seasons
Furman
Furman Paladins football